This is a list of characters for Avataro Sentai Donbrothers, a Japanese tokusatsu television drama. It is the third series in the franchise released in Japan's Reiwa Era and the 46th entry of Toei's long-running Super Sentai series produced by TV Asahi. The series also acts as a sequel for the previous entry, Kikai Sentai Zenkaiger.

Main characters

Donbrothers
The Donbrothers are five individuals who join together to rescue humans who turned into monsters called "Hitotsuki" while protecting them from alien beings called "Noto". Like the Sentai Gears, the Avataro Gears also have special gears based on their Super Sentai predecessors, allowing them to transform into a past Sentai's form via Avatar Change, with the limitation that each of the Donbrothers can only transform into a past Sentai of the same color, so far the only exception being Zenkaizer, whom Taro can transform into, and Jiro, who can transform into the Super Sentai's sixth members, regardless of color. While untransformed, they still can see the Anoni in their true forms and use the Noto Layer for fast traveling with special glasses each of them possess.

Taro Momoi
Found in a peach-shaped capsule as a baby and raised by Jin,  is 21 years old and lives alone, working part-time at the  delivery firm. He eventually loses all of his memories and works at another delivery firm.

Using his personal , he can transform into the  small mecha, which can switch between peach and humanoid forms, via . Using his personal , he can transform into the humanoid  mecha via Avatar Change. Using the  small mecha, he can transform into the armored and caped  via . During the events of the V-Cinema Avataro Sentai Donbrothers vs. Zenkaiger, using the  Gear, he can transform into  clad in Zenkaizer's armor and cape.

Shinichi Saruhara
 is a 21-year-old wise but eccentric young man who is the brains of the team. He never had a job and maintains himself with gifts from those he helps with his wisdom.

Shinichi transforms into the blue-colored  who possesses superhuman strength. Using his personal Robotaro Gear, he can transform into the gorilla-type  mecha via Avatar Change.

Haruka Kito
 is the main viewpoint character of the show. Just after receiving an important prize of her debut work, her career was destroyed when she was falsely accused of plagiarism by mysterious manga artist Naoki Shiina and now works part-time at the Donbura coffee shop, initially unaware of Kaito's secret identity as Zenkaizer Black. Haruka would later learn that Naoki Shiina is actually a version of herself from the future of a parallel universe, though upset that her alternate future self failed to clear her name before leaving. At the end of series, Haruka continues her work with Sonoza's help, and publishes her award-winning manga based on the Donbrothers' adventures, this time without consequences.

Haruka transforms into the yellow-colored  who wields the  kanabō as her side weapon. Using her personal Robotaro Gear, she can transform into the humanoid  mecha via Avatar Change.

Tsubasa Inuzuka
 is a 24-year-old struggling actor who became a fugitive after being falsely accused of putting his theater troupe in a coma and the disappearance of his girlfriend Natsumi, the true culprit being the Crane Juto. His search for Natsumi leads him to the Crane Juto after she assumed the identity of Miho Kijino, putting him at odds with Tsuyoshi. Despite having later cleared his name, Inuzuka becomes a fugitive again as the compensation for using his Kibi-Points to save Sononi's life. This resulted in costing his relationship with Natsumi, but decides to let her go knowing she'll be more happier with Kijino. At the end of series, he is still currently on the run, this time with his new love interest Sononi.

Tsubasa transforms into the black-colored, diminutive  who wields an unnamed giant shuriken as his side weapon. Using his personal Robotaro Gear, he can transform into the dog-type  mecha via Avatar Change.

Tsuyoshi Kijino
 is a 33-year-old just-married employee of the  company who works to support his wife, Miho. Unaware of his wife's true nature as a Juto, Tsuyoshi is so protective of Miho that he is usually violent towards anyone who threatens her and even turns into a Hitotsuki a few times out of his desire to protect her or stay by her side, until he is finally convinced by the other Donbrothers that she was a Juto in disguise, leaving him devastated. Tsuyoshi then quits his job and decides to move from the apartment he shared with Miho, until he is approached by Natsumi, who shared her memories with Miho while she was being held hostage and decided to live with him.

Tsuyoshi transforms into the pink-colored, tall and thin  who possesses flight capabilities. Using his personal Robotaro Gear, he can transform into the pheasant-type  mecha via Avatar Change.

Jiro Momotani
 is a 21-year-old aspiring hero who met Taro once in high school, having a similar origin in found in a peach-shaped capsule as a baby and raised by Terasaki in a village facility. He left his village following Taro's disappearance, claiming it to be a voice in his head urging him to become a hero. He would eventually learn the truth of his adopted parent being a Juto and his hometown being a fabrication, which leaves him devastated, until he and Dark Jiro decide to move on with their lives by fusing both personalities into one, making Jiro complete again.

Using his personal Avataro Gear Alter, he can transform into the  small mecha, which can switch between dragon and humanoid forms, via Alter Change. Using his personal Robotaro Gear, he can transform into the dragon-type  mecha via Avatar Change.

Dark Jiro

Using his personal Robotaro Gear, he can transform into the tiger-type  mecha via Avatar Change.

As with the original Jiro, Dark Jiro is also portrayed by Raizou Ishikawa.

Alters
Using Avataro Gear Alters, Don Momotaro Alter and Don Doragoku Alter can summon other small mecha themed after some mecha pertaining to the previous Super Sentai that can also combine with them for enhanced capabilities.
: A Red Ressha-themed Alter that can combine with Don Momotaro Alter to form the tank-like .
: Three cube-like Alters (themed after Cube Eagle, Cube Shark, and Cube Lion) that can combine with Don Momotaro Alter to form the bird-like .
: A Tyramigo-themed Alter that can combine with Don Momotaro Alter to form the centaur-like .
: A Karakuri Hengen/Nin Shuriken-themed Alter that can combine with Don Doragoku Alter to form , which is armed with four shurikens. It can also enlarge to serve as a flying vehicle that Don Doragoku rides on.
: A Trigger Machine 1gou/Good Striker-themed Alter that can combine with the Lupinranger Alter to form the Good Strike Bazooka.

Don ZenkaiOh
 is a mecha formed by the combination of an enlarged Superbike Enya Rideon with Juran Tyranno via  when the mecha's Robotaro Gear is used. It first appeared in episode 42 of Kikai Sentai Zenkaiger.

Don Onitaijin
 is a mecha formed by the combination of the Donbrothers' Robotaro forms. It is armed with the twin  and can also enlarge to fight a Hitotsuking when the mecha's Robotaro Gear is used.

Toradoragonjin
 is a mecha formed by the combination of Don Robogoku and Don Robobolt. It is armed with the  sword and the  clawed gauntlet and can also enlarge to fight a Hitotsuking.

Toradora Onitaijin
 is a mecha formed by the combination of Don Onitaijin and Toradoragonjin.

Goldon Onitaijin
 is a mecha formed by the combination of Don Onitaijin and an enlarged Omikoshi Phoenix when the Robotaro Gear Avataro Kiwami is used.

Toradora Onitaijin Kiwami
 is a mecha formed by the combination of Toradora Onitaijin and an enlarged Omikoshi Phoenix when the Robotaro Gear Avataro Kiwami is used.

Don King-Ohger
 is a special combination formed from Don Robotaro and the King-Ohgers' primary King-Ohger mecha, with the robot's head replaced with Don Onitaijin's.

Kaito Goshikida
, whom Jin addresses as the "administrator", acts as the owner of the  coffee shop, he is similar in appearance and name with the leader of the Zenkaigers from Zenkaitopia, but his behavior and personality are different. He transforms into  who uses a colorless version of the original Zenkaizer's suit with similar powers and equipment. Kaito assists the Donbrothers from the sidelines, summoning Juran Tyranno to form Don ZenkaiOh, retrieving the Avataro Gears from the defeated Hitotsuki, which are later used by the Donbrothers in battle and monitoring the  obtained by each of Taro's companions that they can exchange for having their wishes granted. Kaito also helped revive Taro when he is almost killed by Sonoi, infusing Taro's body with energy from both his fellow Donbrothers and the Noto which makes him stronger and able to transform into Goldon Momotaro.

Noto
While dependent on human brainwaves for survival, three representatives of the Noto are sent by a mysterious group known as the "Council" to neutralize the Hitotsuki as human desires cause disruptions on their world. The Noto warriors' tendency to force a host's transformation into a Hitotsuki and their method for teleporting hosts into the space between dimensions that initially appeared to kill their quarry, the Noto come into conflict with the Donbrothers, which intensifies when they discover that Taro is a survivor from the Don Clan who created the Juto. Despite these events, the Noto trio end up forming bonds with the Donbrothers, which the Council learn of and deploy Sonoshi in an attempt to confirm it. Sonoshi confirmed the trio’s transgressions and are condemned as traitors for Sonoshi and their group to exterminate. 

The Noto also have a secret method that transplants a Hitotsuki on the verge of maturity from its host into another Noto who becomes the Hitotsuki's new host.

Sonoi
 is a composed man interested the human world's art who enjoys watching paintings. While surprisingly heroic and empathetic towards humans as a whole, he loathes greedy humans enough to personally cause their transformation into Hitotsuki so he can capture them. He also forms a complicated friendship with Taro before learning his identity as Don Momotaro and one of the last living members of the Don Clan, deciding to defeat him in battle. The two eventually have a duel that ends with Sonoi's death and Don Murasame spiriting the Noto's body. Sonoi is later resurrected by the Council using Taro's energy, but his personality is similar to Taro's until he is back to his old personality.

After his resurrection, he can transform into a stronger battle form equipped with an upgraded Noto Shield.

Sononi
 is a woman interested in the human society's love affairs who gets close to Tsubasa and grows feelings for him. These feelings motivate her to talk Tsubasa into killing Miho to free Natsumi, not mentioning to him that Natsumi would die as a result of her connection to the Juto, but she regrets her decision and sacrifices herself to protect both, leading to Tsubasa using his Kibi-Points to revive her at the cost of becoming a fugitive again, as well as his relationship with Natsumi. As a result, Sononi becomes Tsubasa's current love interest, and a fellow fugitive by the end of the series.

While transformed into her white-colored battle form, she wields the  bladed bow, which can be separated into a pair of swords, as her weapon.

Sonoza
 is an emotionless man interested in human emotions. He grows fond of Haruka's manga and encourages her to continue her work.

Recurring characters

Jin Momoi
, also known as the "guardian" is Taro's adoptive father trapped within the closed space between the human world and the Noto Layer, having recruited the other Donbrothers to aid his son.

Naoki Shiina
 is an alias of a version of Haruka Kito from the future of a parallel universe who used her Kibi-Points to travel back in time alongside her boyfriend for a vacation, wearing a bunny costume to conceal her identity and hide from her reality's version of Don Murasame. She played a key role in her alternate past self becoming Oni Sister by accusing the girl of plagiarism.

While able to become Oni Sister like her alternate past self, Future Haruka can also become .

In her true identity, Future Haruka Kito is portrayed by Kohaku Shida, who also portrays Haruka Kito.

Noto Inspectors

Sonoshi is a non-binary inspector who comes from a long line of administrators in Ideon. While transformed into their crimson-colored battle form, they wield the  kunai as their weapon. Sonogo is a female enforcer of Sonoshi who is obsessed with her beauty. Sonoroku is a brutish man and one of Sonoshi's enforcers. While transformed into his gray-colored battle form, he wields the  morning star as his weapon. They are all killed by Sonona and Sonoya, as punishment for their repeated failures and unrelated mischiefs.

Don Murasame
 is a sentient ninjatō called the  who is capable of manifesting an artificial humanoid body via Avatar Change and takes on the identity of a violet-colored, ninja/shark-themed, Donbrother-like warrior. Don Murasame is an artificial life form originally created as the Council's weapon against the Juto that Mother released prematurely to fight the Donbrothers before he could be perfected, effectively making him a fugitive by the Council.

Don Murasame can transform into the  small mecha, which can switch between shark and humanoid forms, via Alter Change and a past Super Sentai's form, but without the need of an Avataro Gear like the Donbrothers, via Avatar Change. Don Murasame later can transform into his Robotaro form via Avatar Change to form , a black-armored version of Don Onitaijin armed with the twin .

Mother
 is an unknown entity from the Noto Layer who releases Don Murasame to do her bidding against the Council's wishes.

Anoni
The  are strange creatures from the Noto Layer who disguise themselves as humans and blend into society, only revealing themselves to assist the Noto or the Hitotsuki in battle or when they are exposed.

Juto
 are artificial life forms that Don Clan created as an alternative energy source for Ideon so the Noto would no longer depend on human brainwaves, but the Juto were sealed away after they end up being a threat to both humans and the Noto. They have a compulsion for folding animal-themed origami related to their true forms. As a Juto can also die if they are unable to acquire a new template while their current template dies of natural causes like old age. The Penguin Juto, modeled after the animal representing the Don Clan, is ranked as the strongest and most intelligent Juto. The lower rank Juto are Crane Juto and the Cat Juto.
Penguin Juto: A powerful Rank-S Juto who is guardian of the Forest of Slumber, formerly a Don Clansman a century ago who assumed his current state to become a powerful immortal. Having assumed the identity of local police officer , he raised Jiro with the purpose of using him as a new template as his current one is slowly dying of old age.

Hitotsuki
The  are humans turned into monsters when overcome by their inner desires whose presence is a threat to both the human world and the Noto Layer. Most of them also are infused with a Sentai Gear. If one of them is defeated by the Donbrothers, their hosts turn back to normal. But if a Noto defeats the Hitotsuki, their hosts are imprisoned within the closed space between the human world and the Noto Layer. In both cases, the gears in their possession separates from their bodies and are converted into Avataro Gears.
: A Hitotsuki who was originally an unnamed taxi driver, captured by Sonoi, only to be later freed among the Noto's victims.
: A Hitotsuki who was originally , Haruka's classmate and a former table tennis club member, whose desire is to become stronger with table tennis. He is captured by Sonoi, only to be later freed among the Noto's victims.
: A knight-themed Hitotsuki infused with the Ryusoulger Gear created by Sonoi. He was originally , a table tennis medalist, whose desire is to prove that he is the strongest. He is defeated by Don Momotaro.
: A train-themed Hitotsuki infused with the ToQger Gear. She was originally , a 68-year-old part-time worker of Shirokuma Express whose desire is to look younger. She is defeated by Don Momotaro, Oni Sister, Inu Brother, and Kiji Brother.
: A phantom thief-themed Hitotsuki infused with the Lupinranger Gear. He was originally , a thief who passes as a courier to steal lights of his victims' houses out of his desire to bring darkness to others. He is captured by Sononi, only to be later freed among the Noto's victims.
: An Ancient Egypt-themed Hitotsuki infused with the Ohranger Gear. He was originally , an onigiri specialty store owner whose desire is to make the best onigiri in Japan. He is defeated by the Donbrothers.
: A police dog-themed Hitotsuki infused with the Patranger Gear. He was originally Kenji Sayama obsessed with apprehending Tsubasa for the sake of his career. He is defeated by Don Momotaro.
: An animal-themed Hitotsuki infused with the Zyuohger Gear. She was originally , a nurse whose desire is to look after her patients. She is defeated by the Donbrothers.
: A globe-themed Hitotsuki infused with the Fiveman Gear. He was originally an unnamed Tsunokado High School principal obsessed with enforcing discipline toward the students. He is defeated by the Donbrothers.
: A gemstone-themed Hitotsuki infused with the Kiramager Gear. He was originally , an artist obsessed in finding a suitable model for his drawings. After Sakaki kidnaps Miho, an enraged Kiji Brother prevents Don Momotaro from defeating Mashinki so Sonoi can capture him. Sakaki is later freed alongside the Noto's other victims.
: A cheetah-themed Hitotsuki infused with the Go-Busters Gear. He was originally , a hospitalized old man whose desire to play as a child again caused him to astral project his consciousness in the form of his childhood self. He is defeated by Don Robotaro.
: A pirate-themed Hitotsuki infused with the Gokaiger Gear. He was originally , an aspiring manga artist. He is defeated by the Robotaro Donbrothers.
: A shuriken-themed Hitotsuki infused with the Ninninger Gear. He was originally Minoru Ōno, who became furious over perceiving Taro's criticism of his ninja skills as an insult. He is defeated by the Robotaro Donbrothers.
: A World Elephant-themed Hitotsuki infused with the Kyuranger Gear. He was originally an unnamed idol otaku. He is defeated by the Robotaro Donbrothers.
: An electric battery-themed Hitotsuki infused with the Kyoryuger Gear. She was originally , a woman craving for attention. She is defeated by the Robotaro Donbrothers.
: A sports car-themed Hitotsuki infused with the Turboranger Gear. He was originally an unnamed high school shogi player who tries to fulfill his desire to become stronger with shogi. He is defeated by Don Robotaro.
: A race car-themed Hitotsuki infused with the Carranger Gear. He was originally Tsuyoshi Kijino, who became furious over his wife being hospitalized after a traffic accident. He is defeated by Don Momotaro and Don Doragoku.
: A dinosaur/fossil-themed Hitotsuki infused with the Zyuranger Gear. He was originally an unnamed gamer who was angered at losing. He is defeated by Don Doragoku.
: A bird-themed Hitotsuki infused with the Jetman Gear. She was originally , a woman who got heartbroken once discovering that Tsubasa, with whom she is infatuated, is Inu Brother. She is defeated by the Robotaro Donbrothers.
: A dragster-themed Hitotsuki infused with the Go-onger Gear. She was originally , a ghost who wants to meet the man she has been in love with for fifty years. Unlike the other Hitotsuki, she transforms into Engineking without being defeated by the Donbrothers.
: A martial arts-themed Hitotsuki infused with the Dairanger Gear. He was originally , a man whose desire is to fight strong opponents to become stronger. He is defeated by Don Torabolt.
: A samurai-themed Hitotsuki infused with the Shinkenger Gear. He was originally , a previous Saru Brother who was overcome with greed, which led him to lose his powers when he used them for his own personal gain, before wanting to know Shinichi's reason to fight. He is defeated by Don Onitaijin.
: A jellyfish/electronics-themed Hitotsuki infused with the Megaranger Gear. He was originally , a rich business person who wants to hear an interesting story to ease his boredom. He is defeated by the Robotaro Donbrothers.
: A Kung-Fu-themed Hitotsuki infused with the Gekiranger Gear. He was originally , an exam candidate who wants to study the constitution of his country at a quiet place. He is defeated by Don Robogoku and Don Robobolt.
: A ninja-themed Hitotsuki infused with the Kakuranger Gear. He was originally , a runaway man who wants something to live for. He is defeated by the Robotaro Donbrothers.
: An Ancient Greece-themed Hitotsuki infused with the Goggle-V Gear. He was originally Manager Yamada, who wants competent subordinates. He is defeated by Don Momotaro and Don Doragoku.
: A magician-themed Hitotsuki infused with the Magiranger Gear. He was originally Minoru Ōno, who now wants to defeat Taro Momoi. He is defeated by Don Torabolt.
: A scientist/volcano-themed Hitotsuki infused with the Dynaman Gear. She was originally , a woman who wants to recover a stolen painting. She is defeated by Don Momotaro and Don Torabolt.
: A dinosaur-themed Hitotsuki infused with the Abaranger Gear. He was originally , a company president who wants his employees to work faster. He is defeated by Don Momotaro.
: A prism/supernova-themed Hitotsuki infused with the Flashman Gear. He was originally , a man who wants to eat more spicy food. He is defeated by Don Doragoku.
: An angel-themed Hitotsuki infused with the Goseiger Gear. The first Tensouki was originally an unnamed big eater who wants to lose weight, while the second was originally , a struggling musician who wants to get back together with his ex-girlfriend and temporarily assumes Tsubasa's place as Inu Brother. The second Tensouki is defeated by Don Onitaijin and Toradoragonjin.
: An adventurer-themed Hitotsuki infused with the Boukenger Gear. He was originally Minoru Ōno, who still wants to defeat Taro Momoi. He is defeated by Sonoi.
: A sun-themed Hitotsuki infused with the Sun Vulcan Gear. He was originally Tsuyoshi Kijino, whose desire is to not let anyone take his wife from him. He is defeated by Goldon Momotaro.
: A police dog/police vehicle-themed Hitotsuki infused with the Dekaranger Gear. He was originally an unnamed oden cart owner, who wants his customers to stop complaining about the food he cooked. He is defeated by Goldon Momotaro.
: An animal-themed Hitotsuki infused with the Liveman Gear. He was originally an unnamed man, who wants to know what youth is. He is defeated by Goldon Momotaro.
: A firefighter-themed Hitotsuki infused with the GoGoFive Gear. He was originally , a man who wants to be rescued. He is defeated by Goldon Momotaro.
: A lion/skull-themed Hitotsuki infused with the Gingaman Gear. Minoru Ōno was initially becoming the host body for Seijuuki, but the Hitotsuki was transplanted from the human into Sonoshi and uses their desire, which is to not forgive their subordinates who set a trap, to manifest before being defeated by Goldon Momotaro and Don Torabolt after Sonoi weakened the monster.
: A computer-themed Hitotsuki infused with the Denjiman Gear. She was originally , a food critic who wants to eat foods with new flavors. She is defeated by Goldon Momotaro.
: A playing card-themed Hitotsuki infused with the JAKQ Gear. She was originally , a woman who wants her boyfriend, Shinnosuke, to pay more attention to her. She is defeated by Goldon Momotaro and Don Doragoku.
: A clockwork-themed Hitotsuki infused with the Timeranger Gear. He was originally , a driving instructor who wants someone to be his instructor. He is defeated by Goldon Momotaro and Don Doragoku.
: A Hindu deity/Buddha-themed Hitotsuki infused with the Maskman Gear. He was originally Santa Claus, who got fed up when children stopped appreciating his presents, despite his efforts to appease them. He is defeated by Goldon Momotaro and Don Doragoku.
: A rainbow-themed Hitotsuki infused with the Gorenger Gear. He was originally , a con artist and sham spiritualist who wants someone to help him to escape from a dangerous family. He is defeated by Goldon Momotaro and Don Torabolt.
: A cyborg-themed Hitotsuki infused with the Bioman Gear. He was originally , an office worker who wants to be praised more. He is defeated by the Donbrothers.
: An animal-themed Hitotsuki infused with the Gaoranger Gear. He was originally Tsuyoshi Kijino, who was overcome with despair with Miho's disappearance. He is captured by Sonoshi's group before being freed when Sonoi manages to free him and the other humans that Noto captured.
: A military soldier-themed Hitotsuki infused with the Changeman Gear. She was originally Tamaki, the same woman who turned into Jakki, also in despair because she thinks Shinnosuke still neglects her. She is defeated alongside Sekaiki by Sonoi using the Zanglassword.
: A Japanese flag-themed Hitotsuki infused with the Battle Fever J Gear. He was originally , Tamaki's boyfriend who wants her to turn back to normal. He is defeated alongside Dengekiki by Sonoi using the Zanglassword.
: A king/insect-themed Hitotsuki infused with the King-Ohger Gear. He was originally Minoru Ōno, who was forcibly turned into a Hitotsuki by Sonoshi, Sonogo and Sonoroku. He is defeated by Don Momotaro.

Other Hitotsuki
: A chimney-themed Hitotsuki who resembles Resshaki. He is defeated by the Donbrothers. This Hitotsuki appears exclusively in the web-exclusive Avataro Sentai Donbrothers Spin-Off: This Is the Donbrothers' Roll Call! The True Avataro!?.
: A fire/tornado/film-themed Hitotsuki infused with the Hurricaneger Gear. He was originally , a film director whose desire is to make a good movie. He is defeated by the Robotaro Donbrothers. This Hitotsuki appears exclusively in the film Avataro Sentai Donbrothers the Movie: New First Love Hero.
: A machine/gear-themed Hitotsuki infused with the Zenkaiger Gear. This Hitotsuki appears exclusively in the V-Cinema Avataro Sentai Donbrothers vs. Zenkaiger.

Hitotsuking
On some occasions, the defeated Hitotsuki evolve into giant forms called  that rampage in the Noto Layer, forcing the Donbrothers to defeat them a second time before successfully rescuing their hosts and extracting the Sentai Gears from their bodies.
: A KishiryuOh-themed Hitotsuking that originated from Kishiryuki's remains. He is destroyed by Don ZenkaiOh.
: A ToQ Ressha-themed Hitotsuking that originated from Resshaki's remains. She is destroyed by Don ZenkaiOh.
: A Pat Kaiser-themed Hitotsuking that originated from Keisatsuki's remains. He is destroyed by Don ZenkaiOh.
: A Max Magma-themed Hitotsuking that originated from Chikyuki's remains. He is destroyed by Don ZenkaiOh.
: A KyurenOh-themed Hitotsuking that originated from Uchuki's remains. He is destroyed by Don Onitaijin. 
: A Kyoryuzin-themed Hitotsuking that originated from Zyudenki's remains. She is destroyed by Don Onitaijin.
: A Turbo Robo-themed Hitotsuking that originated from Kousokuki's remains. He is destroyed by Don Onitaijin.
: A Guardian Beast Tyrannosaurus-themed Hitotsuking that originated from Kyoryuki's remains. He is destroyed by Don Onitaijin.
: A Jet Garuda-themed Hitotsuking that originated from Chojinki's remains. She is destroyed by Don Onitaijin.
: A Go-Roader GT-themed Hitotsuking that originated from Engineki's remains. She is destroyed by Don Onitaijin.
: A RyuseiOh-themed Hitotsuking that originated from Goseiki's remains. He is destroyed by Don Onitaijin.
: A Galaxy Mega-themed Hitotsuking that originated from Denjiki's remains. He is destroyed by Don Onitaijin.
: A GekiBatTohja-themed Hitotsuking that originated from Jukenki's remains. He is destroyed by Toradoragonjin.
: A Samuraiman-themed Hitotsuking that originated from Ninjaki's remains. He is destroyed by Toradoragonjin.
: A Goggle Robo-themed Hitotsuking that originated from Daiki's remains. He is destroyed by Toradoragonjin.
: A Magi King-themed Hitotsuking that originated from Mahouki's remains. He is destroyed by Don Onitaijin and Toradoragonjin.
: A Dyna Robo-themed Hitotsuking that originated from Kagakuki's remains. She is destroyed by Toradora Onitaijin.
: A Bakuryu Tyrannosaurus-themed Hitotsuking that originated from Bakuryuki's remains. He is destroyed by Toradora Onitaijin.
: A Flash King-themed Hitotsuking that originated from Choushinseiki's remains. He is destroyed by Toradora Onitaijin.
: A Deka Base Robo-themed Hitotsuking that originated from Tokusouki's remains. He is destroyed by Goldon Onitaijin.
: A Live Robo-themed Hitotsuking that originated from Choujuki's remains. He is destroyed by Goldon Onitaijin.
: A two mode Go Liner/Beetle Mars-themed Hitotsuking that originated from Kyuukyuuki's remains. He is destroyed by Toradora Onitaijin Kiwami.
: A Gingaioh-themed Hitotsuking that originated from Seijuuki's remains. He is destroyed by Goldon Onitaijin and Toradoragonjin.
: A Spade Ace-themed Hitotsuking that originated from Jakki's remains. She is destroyed by Toradora Onitaijin Kiwami.
: A Time Shadow-themed Hitotsuking that originated from Miraiki's remains. He is destroyed by Toradora Onitaijin Kiwami.
: A Gorenger-themed Hitotsuking that originated from Himitsuki's remains. He is destroyed by Toradora Onitaijin Kiwami.
: A Gao King-themed Hitotsuking that evolved from Hyakujuuki. He is defeated by Don King-Ohger and returns to Hyakujuuki.
: A Change Dragon-themed Hitotsuking that originated from from Dengekiki's remains. She is destroyed by Goldon Onitaijin and Toradoragonjin.
: A Battle Japan-themed Hitotsuking that originated from from Sekaiki's remains. He is destroyed by Toradora Onitaijin Kiwami.

Other characters
: Tsubasa's girlfriend who was a member of their theater troupe before she disappeared during the Crane Juto's attack, the Juto using her as a template for her disguise while Tsubasa is framed for the crime. Natsumi is portrayed by Momoko Arata, who also portrays Miho Kijino.
: Tsuyoshi's boss who briefly became the Hitotsuki Daiki after Tsuyoshi failed in work.
: A retiring detective who pursues Tsubasa. He once turned into a Hitotsuki but is rescued by the Donbrothers. He is one of 41 bus passengers who disappeared during a Juto attack, with a Cat Juto assuming his form and targeting Tsubasa. Sayama later dies as a consequence of Tsubasa killing the detective’s Juto imposter.
: A photographer who temporarily assumes Haruka's place as Oni Sister after she leaves the Donbrothers using her Kibi-Points.
: A man seeking to master the way of the ninja before crossing paths with Taro, resulting in Ōno bearing animosity towards Taro that fuels his transformation into a Hitotsuki on multiple occasions.
: Jiro's childhood friend and love interest who lives in his hometown. She would later be revealed to be one of the illusions Terasaki created to manipulate Jiro.
They would later be revealed to be among the illusions Terasaki created to manipulate Jiro.
Elders: Two leaders of the Council who use Taro's energy to resurrect Sonoi.
: A powerful anti-Donbrother android created by the Don Clan in Taro Momoi's image, intended to be activated should the Donbrothers deviate from their mission. The device needed to activate Don Killer is entrusted to Kaito before Jiro unknowingly awakens Don Killer, who proceeds to attack the Donbrothers until forced into an apparently endless conflict with Don Killer Killer in outer space. Don Killer is portrayed by Kouhei Higuchi, who also portrays Taro Momoi.
: A powerful battle android created by the Don Clan as a countermeasure in the likelihood of Don Killer going berserk, resembling Shinichi Saruhara. Don Killer Killer's activation device is entrusted to Terasaki before Jiro awakens the android to battle Don Killer, the two androids ending up in an apparently endless conflict in outer space. Don Killer Killer is portrayed by Yuuki Beppu, who also portrays Shinichi Saruhara.
Future Shinichi Saruhara: A version of Shinichi Saruhara from the future of a parallel universe who is Future Haruka's boyfriend and transforms into Saru Brother. Future Shinichi Saruhara is portrayed by Yuuki Beppu, who also portrays Shinichi Saruhara.
Future Don Murasame: A more dangerous version of Don Murasame from the future of a parallel universe, lacking Mother as a conscience to keep him in check. He pursues after Future Haruka to eliminate her as a time anomaly, only to be destroyed by Don Murasame for similar reasons. Future Don Murasame is voiced by Ayumu Murase, who also voices Don Murasame.
: A white-haired female Noto executioner. She is killed alongside Sonoya by Don Momotaro.
: A male Noto executioner. He is killed alongside Sonona by Don Momotaro.

Notes

References

Super Sentai characters
, Avataro Sentai Donbrothers